Silicon Institute of Technology, Sambalpur (known as Silicon West) is a private engineering college located in Sambalpur, Odisha, India. Established in 2009, it is affiliated to Biju Patnaik University of Technology, Odisha. It is the sister college of Silicon Institute of Technology, Bhubaneswar. It was set up and is managed by a non-profit making trust known as Samleswari Education Trust.

In 2018, IIM Sambalpur was functioning from the premises of this college.

References

External links

Private engineering colleges in India
Engineering colleges in Odisha
Universities and colleges in Sambalpur
Colleges affiliated with Biju Patnaik University of Technology
Educational institutions established in 2009
2009 establishments in Orissa